Women's Slalom World Cup 1966/1967

Calendar

Final point standings

In Women's Slalom World Cup 1966/67 the best 3 results count.

Women's Slalom Team Results

All points were shown including individual deduction. bold indicate highest score - italics indicate race wins

Women's slalom
FIS Alpine Ski World Cup slalom women's discipline titles